The 1985 Vuelta a Murcia was the first professional edition of the Vuelta a Murcia cycle race and was held on 26 February to 3 March 1985. The race started and finished in Murcia. The race was won by José Recio.

General classification

References

1985
1985 in road cycling
1985 in Spanish sport